Router software requires updating to stay secure, this comparison provides an overview of third party options.

Embedded

General

Features

Devices

Other

See also
 List of router and firewall distributions
 List of router firmware projects

References

Free routing software
 
Network software comparisons